Neil Cusack (born 30 December 1951 in Limerick) is a retired middle and long distance runner from Ireland.

Early life 
Cusack was born in Limerick city in 1951 and attended St Munchin's College. Cusack attended East Tennessee State University. In 1972 he was the NCAA Men's Cross Country National Champion.

Running career 
Cusack won the Boston Marathon in 1974. He remains the only Irish athlete to have won in Boston. In 1981 Cusack won the Dublin Marathon.

Olympics
Cusack represented Ireland in the 1972 Summer Olympics in Munich, Germany and in the 1976 Olympic Games in Montreal, Quebec, Canada.

Achievements

References

External links
St Munchin's College
 Neil Cusack in 'Sports People' file at Limerick City Library, Ireland

1951 births
Living people
Irish male marathon runners
Irish male long-distance runners
People educated at St Munchin's College
East Tennessee State University alumni
Athletes (track and field) at the 1972 Summer Olympics
Athletes (track and field) at the 1976 Summer Olympics
Olympic athletes of Ireland
Boston Marathon male winners